The Association of American Railroads (AAR) is an industry trade group representing primarily the major freight railroads of North America (Canada, Mexico and the United States). Amtrak and some regional commuter railroads are also members. Smaller freight railroads are typically represented by the American Short Line and Regional Railroad Association (ASLRRA), although some smaller railroads and railroad holding companies are also members of the AAR. The AAR also has two associate programs, and most associates are suppliers to the railroad industry.

Creation
AAR was created October 12, 1934, by the merger of five industry-related groups:
 The American Railway Association
 The Association of Railway Executives
 The Bureau of Railroad Economics
 The Railway Accounting Officers Association
 The Railway Treasury Officers Association

William George Besler was its first President.

Facilities and subsidiaries
The AAR is headquartered in Washington, D.C., not far from the Capitol.  Its information technology subsidiary, Railinc, is based in Cary, North Carolina.  Railinc IT systems and information services, including the Umler system, the Interline Settlement System and Embargoes system are an integral part of the North American rail infrastructure.  Railinc delivers approximately nine million messages each day over its EDI network, including transportation waybills, advance train consists, blocking requests and responses and trip plans.  Its applications support railroads, equipment owners and rail industry suppliers along every link of the supply chain.  The company maintains the only industry-accepted version of the North American railroad industry's official code tables. Beginning as an information technology department within the Association of American Railroads (AAR), the company was established as a wholly owned, for-profit subsidiary of the AAR in 1999.

The facility is under a care, custody and control contract with the Federal Railroad Administration. TTCI has an array of specialized testing facilities and tracks. The site enables testing of freight and passenger rolling stock, vehicle and track components, and safety devices.

Functions
Where appropriate, the AAR represents its members' interests to the public at large and to Congress and government regulators in particular.  The AAR works to improve the efficiency, safety and service of the railroad industry, such as through its responsibility for the industry's interchange rules and equipment specifications, e.g. for locomotive multiple unit control.

One of the AAR's duties is to oversee the assignment of reporting marks – two to four letter codes that uniquely identify the owner of any piece of railroad rolling stock or intermodal freight transport equipment (trailers, semi-trailers, containers, etc.) that can be carried on a railroad.

Reports 
In November 2013 the AAR urged the U.S. Pipeline and Hazardous Materials Safety Administration (PHMSA) to press for improved tank car safety by requiring all tank cars used to transport flammable liquids to be retrofitted or phased out, and new cars be built to more stringent standards."

Members

AAR Full Members 

 Alaska Railroad
 Railroads owned by Anacostia Rail Holdings Company
 BNSF Railway Company
 Canadian National Railway (US operations)
 Canadian Pacific Railway (US operations)
 CSX Transportation
 Florida East Coast Railway
 Railroads owned by Genesee & Wyoming
 Indiana Rail Road
 Iowa Interstate Railroad
 Kansas City Southern Railway
 Metra
 National Railroad Passenger Corporation (Amtrak)
 Norfolk Southern Railway
 Pan Am Railways
 Railroads owned by R.J. Corman Railroad Group
 Union Pacific Railroad
 Vermont Railway
 Railroads owned by Watco
 Wheeling and Lake Erie Railway

AAR Special Members (Canadian and Mexican Railroads)
 Canadian Pacific Railway (Canadian operations)
 Canadian National Railway (Canadian operations)
 Ferrocarril Transístmico
 Ferrosur
 Ferromex
 Ferrocarril y Terminal del Valle de México
 Kansas City Southern de México

See also 
 American Railway Association
 Organisation for the Combined Operations of Railways (OSShD)
 International Union of Railways (UIC)
 African Union of Railways (AUR)
 AAR wheel arrangement

References

Further reading

External links

 Association of American Railroads website
 Railinc
 Transportation Technology Center
 Association of American Railroads (AAR) Reporting Marks
 AAR Records 1939~1978, PSU Library

Rail transportation in North America
Trade associations based in the United States
1934 establishments in Washington, D.C.
Railway associations